The 2012 Men's Queensland Basketball League season was the 27th running of the competition. The Mackay Meteors won the championship in 2012 to claim their second league title.

The teams for this season were: Brisbane Capitals, Bundaberg Bulls, Cairns Marlins, Gladstone Port City Power, Gold Coast Rollers, Ipswich Force, Mackay Meteors, Maroochydore Clippers, Northside Wizards, Rockhampton Rockets, South West Metro Pirates, Toowoomba Mountaineers and Townsville Heat.

Team information

Standings

Finals

*The team that finishes 1st overall goes straight through to the semi-finals.

**The top two teams from each pool face-off in the quarter-finals.

QF 1: 1st in Pool A vs. 2nd in Pool A
QF 2: 1st in Pool B vs. 2nd in Pool C
QF 3: 1st in Pool C vs. 2nd in Pool B

Awards

Player of the Week

Coach of the Month

Statistics leaders

Regular season
 Most Valuable Player: Michael Cedar (Mackay Meteors)
 Coach of the Year: Neal Tweedy (Rockhampton Rockets)
 U23 Youth Player of the Year: Todd Blanchfield (Townsville Heat)
 All-League Team:
 G: Shaun Gleeson (Ipswich Force)
 G: Mitch Philp (Rockhampton Rockets)
 F: Todd Blanchfield (Townsville Heat)
 F: Aaron Grabau (Cairns Marlins)
 C: Travis Reed (Rockhampton Rockets)

Finals
 Grand Final MVP: Michael Cedar (Mackay Meteors)

References

External links
 2012 QBL Official Draw
 2012 Finals articles
 Rockets and Meteors win semis

2012
2011–12 in Australian basketball
2012–13 in Australian basketball